Richard S. Johnson is a contemporary American painter based in Chicago, Illinois.

Biography 
Johnson was born in Chicago to a family of artists. While still in primary school, Johnson was accepted as a scholar to the Art Institute of Chicago. A graduate of the American Academy of Art, he embarked on a career as an illustrator.

Influences 
Johnson is heavily influenced by Charles Dana Gibson, N.C. Wyeth, and John Singer Sargent, whose books he read as a child.

Style 
Johnson's style has been regarded as having the technical excellence of Pre-Raphaelite romanticism mixed with contemporary expressionism and abstraction.

Johnson has also made portraits of historical personalities, such as former US president John F. Kennedy and former NASA administrator Richard H. Truly. His portrait of JFK now hangs at the John F. Kennedy Presidential Library and Museum in Boston, Massachusetts. He was also commissioned to create a commemorative painting honoring former US presidents. The painting is currently on display at the President's Council on Fitness, Sports, and Nutrition in Washington, D.C.

References

External links 
 Richard Johnson's biography at the Art Shop NC website

1939 births
Living people
20th-century American painters
American male painters
21st-century American painters
21st-century American male artists
Artists from Chicago
20th-century American male artists